Alfred Hansen (1885–1935) was a German cinematographer of the silent and early sound era.

Selected filmography
 Carmen (1918)
 The Rosentopf Case (1918)
 Meyer from Berlin (1919)
 The Flame (1923)
 Three Waiting Maids (1925)
 If You Have an Aunt (1925)
 Athletes (1925)
 The Man Who Sold Himself (1925)
 Vienna - Berlin (1926)
 The Sea Cadet (1926)
 The Man Without Sleep (1926)
 The Trumpets are Blowing (1926)
 Give My Regards to the Blonde Child on the Rhine (1926)
 Nanette Makes Everything (1926)
 The White Spider (1927)
 Petronella (1927)
 The Tragedy of a Lost Soul (1927)
 The Lady and the Chauffeur (1928)
 When the Guard Marches (1928)
 The House Without Men (1928)
 Bobby, the Petrol Boy (1929)
 Flachsmann the Educator (1930)
 The Battle of Bademunde (1931)
 Errant Husbands (1931)
 Such a Greyhound (1931)

References

Bibliography

External links 
 

1885 births
1935 deaths
German cinematographers
Film people from Berlin